Hydrobia djerbaensis is a species of minute aquatic snail, an operculate gastropod mollusk in the family Hydrobiidae.

Description

Distribution

References

Hydrobiidae
Hydrobia
Endemic fauna of Tunisia
Gastropods described in 2002